Kristen Schlukebir (born June 28, 1989) was the number one ranked junior in the United States between the ages of 15-18.  At 15, she won the USTA 18 & Under National Hardcourts in both singles and doubles granting her a wildcard into the main draw of the US Open. Kristen  turned professional at age 18 and played on the Women's Tennis Association tour for over two years, reaching a career high in singles of No. 161.

Kristen had two older sisters, Karie and Katie both who played tennis. Katie attended Stanford University and played on the tennis team. Karie attended Indiana University on a tennis scholarship but died in 2010 from melanoma.

ITF Finals

Singles (0–3)

Doubles (5–10)

References

1987 births
Living people
American female tennis players
Sportspeople from Kalamazoo, Michigan
Tennis people from Michigan
21st-century American women